British History Online is a digital library of primary and secondary sources on medieval and modern history of Great Britain and Ireland. It was created and is managed as a cooperative venture by the Institute of Historical Research, University of London and the History of Parliament Trust. Access to the majority of the content is free, but other content is available only to paying subscribers.

The content includes secondary sources such as the publications of The History of Parliament, the Royal Commission on the Historical Monuments of England, the Calendar of Close Rolls, Survey of London and the Victoria County History; and major published primary sources such as Letters and Papers of the Reign of Henry VIII and the Journals of the House of Lords and House of Commons.

The places covered by British History Online are:

British History Online began with a one-year pilot project in 2002 (Version 1.0), and Version 5.0 was launched in December 2014. Version 5.0 contains a number of new features, including subject guides for local, parliamentary and urban history, and a new viewer for the site's collection of historical and Epoch 1 Ordnance Survey maps.

See also
List of civil parishes in England

References

External links
 British History Online

British digital libraries
Historiography of the United Kingdom
 Digital history projects
 Digital humanities projects